Stephen Carley joined Red Robin Gourmet Burgers, Inc. as Chief Executive Officer and as a director in September 2010. Prior to joining Red Robin, Carley served from April 2001 to August 2010 as the Chief Executive Officer of El Pollo Loco, Inc., a privately held restaurant company headquartered in Costa Mesa, California. Prior to his service at El Pollo Loco, Carley served in various management positions with several companies, including, PhotoPoint Corp., Universal City Hollywood, PepsiCo, Inc., and the Taco Bell Group.

Education
Carley attended the University of Illinois College of Business where he graduated with a Bachelor of Science degree in finance. He later attended Northwestern University where he received a master's degree with a concentration in marketing.

Career
Carley began his career in the food and beverage industry with PepsiCo Inc. During his 12 years at Pepsico during the 1980s and 1990s, Carley held several posts at Taco Bell.

He became the CEO of El Pollo Loco after being laid-off from three positions. Carley credits the layoffs with his success saying, "I wouldn't have this phenomenal opportunity without those layoffs, and would have missed out on one of the most gratifying leadership opportunities of my career".  Carley was featured in NBC's The Apprentice alongside Donald Trump. During the sixth-season episode, Carley was the first person other than Trump to delegate an assignment to the contestants.

References

Gies College of Business alumni
Kellogg School of Management alumni
Living people
American chief executives of food industry companies
Year of birth missing (living people)
The Apprentice (franchise) contestants